Bodie James Olmos (born August 27, 1975) is an American actor. He is the son of Edward James Olmos and Kaija Keel, and grandson of Howard Keel.

His older brother is actor Mico Olmos, and his younger sister is Daniela Olmos. His first on screen appearance was on The Ballad of Gregorio Cortez in 1982 when he was 7 years old. His most recent appearance on television is alongside his father in Battlestar Galactica as Lieutenant Junior Grade Brendan "Hotdog" Costanza. He also acted in a film directed by his father named Walkout.

Filmography

Film and television
 The Ballad of Gregorio Cortez (1982) – (uncredited) Rangers Son
 Stand and Deliver (1988) – Fernando Escalante
 The Wonderful Ice Cream Suit (1998)
 American Family Journey of Dreams (4 episodes, 2002) – Young Jess Gonzales
 Manejar (2005) – Daniel
 The Last Winter (2006)
 Walkout (2006) – Moctesuma Esparza
 Splinter (2006) – Forensics Officer
 Resilience (2006) – Al
 Battlestar Galactica (36 episodes, 2004–2009) – Brendan 'Hot Dog' Constanza
 Battlestar Galactica: The Plan (2009) – Brendan 'Hot Dog' Constanza

References

External links
 

Living people
American male film actors
American male television actors
American male actors of Mexican descent
Place of birth missing (living people)
Hispanic and Latino American male actors
1975 births
20th-century American male actors
21st-century American male actors